Josep Rukki (also Joseph Rukki; 1880 Saksi Parish (now Tapa Parish), Kreis Wierland – 23 April 1942 Sverdlovsk Oblast) was an Estonian politician. He was a member of the V Riigikogu, representing the Estonian Socialist Workers' Party. He was a member of the Riigikogu since 23 May 1934. He replaced Mihkel Martna. On 25 May 1934, he resigned his position and he was replaced by August Gustavson.

References

1880 births
1942 deaths
People from Tapa Parish
People from Kreis Wierland
Estonian Socialist Workers' Party politicians
Members of the Riigikogu, 1932–1934
Estonian people executed by the Soviet Union
People who died in the Gulag